John M. McNamara is an English mathematical biologist and Emeritus Professor of Mathematics and Biology in the School of Mathematics at the University of Bristol. He was elected a fellow of the Royal Society in 2012. In 2013, he and Alasdair Houston jointly received the ASAB Medal, and in 2014, he received the Weldon Memorial Prize. In 2018, he was awarded the Sewall Wright Award from the American Society of Naturalists.

References

External links
Faculty page

20th-century English mathematicians
21st-century English mathematicians
English biologists
Living people
Academics of the University of Bristol
Alumni of the University of Oxford
Alumni of the University of Sussex
English ecologists
Fellows of the Royal Society
Year of birth missing (living people)